Terra is the name used by three fictional superheroines published by DC Comics. The first Terra, Tara Markov, is an antiheroine eventually revealed to actually be a supervillainess working as a double agent. She was created by Marv Wolfman and George Pérez, and debuted in New Teen Titans #26 (December 1982).

The second Terra, a doppelgänger of Tara Markov, debuted in New Titans #79 (September 1991) and was created by Marv Wolfman and Tom Grummett.

The third Terra, Atlee, debuted in Supergirl (vol. 5) #12 (January 2007) and was created by Jimmy Palmiotti, Justin Gray, and Amanda Conner.

Publication history
The character was created with an intended finite life span. Co-creator Pérez stated that he and Marv Wolfman knew, "from the very start, that this girl was going to be a traitor and that we were going to kill this character off." When creating the look of the character, Pérez noted that:

A new Terra appeared in Supergirl (vol. 5) #12 while a Terra limited series was being developed, written by Jimmy Palmiotti and Justin Gray, with illustrations by Amanda Conner. Gray commented about the series, "Terra as a character has never had a definitive origin. That includes Terra 1 and 2. This mini will address that fact in some surprising ways and open the door to a new corner of the DCU. Aside from that the emphasis will be on heroism, true blue hero stuff." Palmiotti later stated, "Terra is an enigma for obvious reasons. Every hero in the DCU is in the dark about who she is and why she’s doing what she’s doing, which is running around the planet saving and helping people. We’ve been working with Terra for months and months trying to find and develop what’s special about her. In the end, it was a very simple angle, make Terra a superhero with plenty of emphasis on heroism. Everything she does is to help other people and in the service of life." The 4-issue miniseries was temporarily shelved for a number of reasons, until its biweekly publication spanning November and December 2008. The new Terra previously appeared in Teen Titans vol. 3 #52–54 as part of "The Titans of Tomorrow...Today!" storyline and in the first issue of the Terror Titans limited series. Following this, she briefly appeared in Teen Titans vol. 3 #69 in the climax of the recruitment drive storyline, and became a supporting character in the ongoing Power Girl series.

Tara Markov

Fictional character biography

Tara Markov, half-sister of Brion Markov (Geo-Force), was the illegitimate daughter of the King of Markovia. While in Markovia, she came under the care of a Dr. Helga Jace and, through her experiments, Terra obtained Earth manipulation powers—specifically, the ability to control all forms of earthen matter. After obtaining these powers, her father requested that she leave Markovia for the United States, to prevent the scandal of the king having an illegitimate daughter from becoming public. Unlike her more heroic brother, Geo-Force, Terra had deep-rooted psychological issues including malignant narcissism, believing that, with their powers, they should rule Earth rather than help the weaker masses.

As a result of this belief, Terra became a hitwoman, doing dirty work for others. A notable client was Deathstroke the Terminator, who she met when she was fifteen and with whom she had a relationship. She joined the Teen Titans, fooling them by staging a battle against Deathstroke. She then operated as a spy for Deathstroke, eventually giving him the information he needed to kidnap the Titans, with no regrets.

Eventually, the captured Titans were held in a stronghold of Deathstroke's contractors, the H.I.V.E.; Nightwing, and Deathstroke's son, Joseph Wilson (Jericho), raided the complex to rescue them, but were captured. When presented to Deathstroke and the organization in general, Jericho possessed his father and freed the Titans, who then attacked the H.I.V.E. Not knowing of Jericho's powers, Terra believed Deathstroke to have turned against her. In retaliation, she went berserk. When the misunderstanding was cleared, she was still murderously furious at Deathstroke for going "soft" with love for his son. Changeling (better known as Beast Boy), in an attempt to stop her rampage, shape-shifted into a small fly, then flew into her eye as a way to distract her. This finally pushed her over the edge as she pulled the whole H.I.V.E. complex down upon herself while trying to kill the Titans. Despite the discovery of her true intentions of joining them, a statue of her was placed in the memorial in Titans Tower. Her true activities were never made public, with her brother simply being told that she had died in battle. Subsequently, Batman eventually revealed the truth to him in an issue of Batman and the Outsiders, prompting Brion to change his costume to green and gold, as he considered the original brown and orange too similar to the outfit worn by his sister.

In DCU: Last Will and Testament, Deathstroke takes credit for Terra's insanity by claiming he gave her the same serum he used on Cassandra Cain and his daughter, Rose Wilson, telling Geo-Force that "the problem with Terra was that we waited too long. By then the psychosis was so bad, she tried to kill us all." This contradicts his earlier account of her lifelong insanity in the Titans stories following "The Judas Contract," although it is possible that Terra had mental issues from the start and that Deathstroke's serum served to exacerbate them, to the point where Terra had her psychotic break that resulted in her death.

The 2008 Terra miniseries had intended to explain that Terra was driven insane by an element called "quixium" harvested from Strata, which had been used by Markovian scientists to grant her earth-based superpowers. With a year-long delay in the publication of the Terra miniseries and the interim release of DCU: Last Will and Testament, this plot point was dropped completely. According to Justin Gray, "Terra 1 stays as she is in LW&T. The brain damage was part of the initial story (before LW&T) that connected all three Terras and Geo-Force to Strata, the book needed to be changed to reflect LW&T, the double ship made changes to issue #2 impossible. It happens and we all did what we could to make it work."

Blackest Night

In the first issue of Blackest Night: Titans, Terra's corpse is reanimated as a Black Lantern, seducing Beast Boy using an illusion cast by Lilith to mask her decayed appearance. During the battle of the Black Lantern Titans, they were overwhelmed. Hawk (Holly Granger) plunges her hand into Dawn's chest. Dawn suddenly radiates a white energy that completely destroys Holly's body and ring. Dawn then turns the light on the other Black Lanterns, destroying all but Hank Hall, Tempest, and Terra, who quickly retreat.

Terra then travels to the Outsiders' base to see her brother. She claims to have broken free of whatever force was controlling her as a Black Lantern, and begs Geo-Force and the other Outsiders to kill her. However, this was later revealed to be a ruse, a way of getting Geo-Force to display the strongest emotions possible. After a mostly one-sided battle, Terra's body is turned to stone by Geo-Force, and her ring is destroyed by Halo.

The New 52
In September 2011, The New 52 rebooted DC's continuity. In this new timeline, Terra/Tara is re-established as a blonde earth-powered heroine who is part of Caitlin Fairchild's team The Ravagers. The team also includes Beast Boy, Thunder and Lightning and a new character Ridge. The Ravagers are a group of super-powered teens who have escaped the plans of Harvest in The Culling. The team was formed after the Teen Titans and the Legionnaires stuck in the present day were abducted by Harvest, and then later stopped the villain and escaped.

Not surprisingly in the series Terra and Beast Boy develop a strong bond with each other which started in a place named The Colony where super-powered teenagers are deprived of their origins and family and kept as prisoners by a creature named Harvest where they suffer tortures, experiments and fight each other to remain only the strongest teens to be used by Harvest as a team to serve his purposes. In this place, Terra defends Beast Boy from being attacked by other super-powered prisoners as he returns the favour later when Terra was in danger, saving her.

Once free of the Colony, Terra and Beast Boy separated from the rest of their fellow Ravagers, hiding together in a cave. Later Beast Boy started having nightmares with the remaining Ravagers all covered with blood. It was later revealed that the one causing his nightmares was Brother Blood as he was targeting the one who could be used as a key to help his master gain access to The Red. Due to his connection with The Red, Beast Boy was the only one who could sense the evil intents of Brother Blood and therefore the key Blood was looking for. After sensing his presence, Terra was convinced by Gar to help the remaining Ravagers who were captured by Blood to be used as a sacrifice in his ritual and they eventually manage to stop and defeat Blood.

After those events, Fairchild led the team to a place in Los Angeles. There the team is confronted by Superboy and Niles Caulder. Caulder is introduced as a long time associate of Fairchild. Later Fairchild and Caulder introduce the team to a deep underground science facility, which provides headquarters and combat training for the team in their campaign against the organization of N.O.W.H.E.R.E. Meanwhile, Harvest sent Rose Wilson and Warblade to recapture them.

As the series progresses, Terra and Beast Boy begin developing romantic feelings for each other. Later Terra reveals her feelings for Gar by teasing him: "Why in the world haven't you tried to kiss me yet?" After they do kiss, they become a couple.

When Rose and Warblade have difficulties in capturing the Ravagers, Harvest makes a deal with Deathstroke to hunt down the Ravagers and attack each one using a special weapon called the Abeo Blade. Succeeding in invading Caulder's place, Deathstroke manages to "kill" Ridge (in his human form - a child), Caulder himself, Thunder and Lightning using the weapon and also cuts Warblade's head off. As Deathstroke chooses an already injured Beast Boy as his next victim, a desperate Terra tries to stop him in fear of losing Gar. But her attempt falls short as she is hit and burned by Deathstroke's Abeo Blade to which a horrified Garfield sees right before his eyes. After losing Terra pure rage takes command of Beast Boy as he tried to avenge her but with no success. After the battle with Beast Boy, Deathstroke proceeds and hits Rose and then Fairchild with the Abeo Blade finishing his job. Later it is revealed that the Abeo Blade was not a killing weapon and instead of a teleportation device, sending Rose and the Ravagers except Beast Boy back to the Colony once again. As part of the deal, Harvest gives Rose and Terra to Deathstroke.

DC Rebirth
Tara made her return in Deathstroke as a member of the new team Defiance.

Tara Markov doppelgänger

Terra was introduced as a young girl from the early 21st century who had been exposed to a DNA virus designed to transform her into a genetic doppelgänger of the original Terra. As part of the Team Titans, Terra went back in time to the year 1992 to stop the birth of Teen Titan Donna Troy's firstborn son, who would grow up to be the tyrannical Lord Chaos.

Terra shared a mutual attraction to the Teen Titan Changeling. Unfortunately, despite their attraction, Changeling was openly hostile toward Terra II due to his own emotional scars from being used by the original Terra.

The final issues of Team Titans revealed that the group's mysterious "leader" was Hank Hall, former Titan Hawk, who became the renegade time-traveling villain Monarch. His attempts to erase the universe from existence as part of Hal Jordan's plan to remake the universe during "Zero Hour" resulted in the erasing of the future that gave birth to the Team Titans. Only Terra and Mirage survived due to the aid of the Time Trapper.

After the events of "Zero Hour," Terra and Mirage joined the main Teen Titans team. Once there, they were told that they, along with fellow time traveler Deathwing (an evil version of Dick Grayson from the Lord Chaos future timeline), were really from the present day. The Time Trapper had whisked them away from the present to place them within Monarch's army of Titans to keep track of Monarch's schemes.

After New Titans was canceled, Terra remained in limbo until the 1998 revival of the Teen Titans. In the 1999 Titans Secret Files special, Terra visits Geo-Force and undergoes genetic tests to determine her identity. When she expresses her fears that she is the original Terra, Geo-Force (who discovers that the test results confirm only what was previously known, that she was a genetic match for his sister) informs her that she is not his sister and destroys the test results. Later, under circumstances which have yet to be explained, Terra also becomes affiliated with the Outsiders.

In the "Titans Tomorrow" storyline, the Titans glimpse a grim possible future, and Terra (in a costume modeled closely after her original) is a member of the Titans East, a more benign rival group that opposes the fascist future versions of the current Teen Titans. This future's version of Beast Boy, calling himself Animal Man, still bears a grudge against Terra and wants nothing to do with her.

Terra is one of the many Titans who answer the summon to help Conner Kent defeat Superboy-Prime in Infinite Crisis #4, working with Sand to hit Prime with a mass of earth in an attempt to stop him.

52
Terra is a member of the Teen Titans group, led by Beast Boy, who fights Black Adam during the World War III storyline. In their second encounter with the crazed Marvel, she catches Black Adam off guard by crushing him between two massive boulders. Although this maneuver hurts Adam, it fails to disable him, and in a fit of anger he punches through her chest, killing her instantly. Instead of pursuing Black Adam, the Titans stay behind to bury their fallen comrade.

Origin
The mystery of the second Terra's origins was addressed in the 2008 Terra miniseries. She had been born in an underground world called Strata and sent away by its members to establish relations with the surface world. She allowed the Stratans to surgically alter her to resemble the original Terra, believing surface-dwellers would more easily accept her if she reminded them of one of their own. They used an element called "quixium" to grant her earth-based powers similar to that of her predecessor, a process that, when combined with the original Terra's DNA, had the unfortunate side-effect of total memory loss.

Atlee

Fictional character biography

A new Terra named Atlee appears in Supergirl vol. 5 #12 (January 2007), sporting a new outfit and black hair. She emerges near a party Supergirl is attending, fighting a creature from a civilization under the Earth's surface. While Supergirl expresses disdain for the superhero activities which interfere with her personal life, Terra counters by saying that being a superhero is simply the right thing to do; she does not comprehend Supergirl's complaints. Together they defeat the monster by collapsing the ground under it. Terra then departs. The Terra miniseries revealed that she is a member of an alien race called Stratans who live below the Earth's surface in a massive cave called Strata which is actually the empty spacesuit of a long dead cosmic extraterrestrial, and possesses a rare mutation granted by a unique ore called "quixium" that grants her the earth powers she wields.

Titans of Tomorrow...Today!

Atlee appears as a future version of herself in Teen Titans vol. 3 #52-54 as part of the "Titans of Tomorrow...Today!" storyline

Terror Titans

During the Final Crisis crossover, a group of teen supervillains calling themselves the Terror Titans begin abducting teenaged metahumans to use as competitors in the Dark Side Club, an underground arena where the young heroes are brainwashed and forced to fight to the death for spectators and wealthy patrons. After learning of the abductions, Terra goes on the run, eventually meeting up with fellow teen superheroes Aquagirl, Molecule, Offspring, Zachary Zatara, and the Star-Spangled Kid. While deciding on a course of action, the teens are ambushed by the Terror Titans, who proceed to overpower and capture them, killing Molecule in the process. Atlee and the others are taken to the Dark Side Club and subjected to the Anti-Life Equation, which causes them to become slaves to Darkseid and his cadre of followers. After winning several matches in the tournament, Terra is made a member of the Clock King's Martyr Militia, a team of brainwashed superhumans he plans to use on an attack in Los Angeles. Atlee and the others are ultimately freed from the Anti-Life Equation when Miss Martian, Rose Wilson, and Static lead a rebellion against the Terror Titans and capture the various members of the Dark Side Club.

In the aftermath of the successful rebellion, Atlee accompanies her rescuers and fellow survivors to Titans Tower in San Francisco, hoping to take some time to recuperate. While resting, Atlee is offered a spot on the Teen Titans by Wonder Girl, which she politely declines, saying that she wishes to distance herself from the tragedy surrounding the membership of the previous two bearers of the Terra identity.

Power Girl sidekick
Rested from her stay with the Titans, Atlee returns to be the sidekick of Power Girl, successfully helping her save Manhattan from the Ultra-Humanite. After that, she elects Manhattan as her base of operation, to benefit from the constant mentoring of Power Girl both in establishing and maintaining a human identity, and in her superhero persona. She takes on an Australian accent in her civilian identity, finding the half-truth of her being from "down under" quite humorous. She and Power Girl begin a close friendship, going to movies and even shopping together at an IKEA-esque Scandinavian furniture store. Atlee also decides to drop her Australian accent, instead claiming that her new cover identity is that of a spy, something Power Girl finds quite humorous.

Terra helps Power Girl during her battle with Satanna, and later ends up discussing the possibility of joining the Justice Society or the Teen Titans. Power Girl notices that Atlee's demeanor has changed, and begins to suspect that something is wrong. It is eventually revealed that Atlee had been kidnapped by Ultra-Humanite and had her brain removed for him to place his brain in her body, due to Power Girl crippling his body in a former fight. Eventually, Power Girl is able to retrieve Atlee, now trapped in the crippled simian body of the Ultra-Humanite, and bring her back to Strata. There, Atlee is given her body back and the Ultra-Humanite is turned into the human Gerard Shugel. In this occasion, Atlee expresses no desire to stay in Strata, asking Power Girl to bring her back to the surface world, to which she has grown a liking, as soon as possible.

In Wonder Woman #600, Atlee appears alongside fellow teen heroines Batgirl and Supergirl as part of an all-female team designed to repel a faux-alien invasion. After the battle is over, Atlee proclaims that she thinks she could take Wonder Woman in a fight, a notion that Stargirl scoffs at.

The New 52

Atlee debuted in the New 52 continuity in Starfire #3. She has also appeared in Harley Quinn's Rebirth series befriending Harley and helping her and Power Girl take down an alien overlord. Mostly she and Harley watched as Power Girl reluctantly agreed to go on a date with him, got mad, and pummeled him as she has in similar situations in the past. They were just deciding what to do with him, as he had been previously buried in a cocoon, when he wandered off and got hit by a truck. Atlee and Harley then decided to hit the town with a few of Harley's friends.

Powers and personality
Despite her horrific ordeal at the hands of the Dark Side Club and her earlier appearances as a serious, keeps-to-herself, quiet and polite young woman, Atlee's personality is on the opposite end of the spectrum from the original Tara. As Tara mostly hid a brooding, dark personality, Atlee's true self seems to be the one of a cheery, peppy, and nonsensical adolescent, completely innocent about surface life, and hailing from a society who apparently banished malice and human greed from their lifestyles. As a result, she takes an early veneration for Power Girl, seldom leaving her side. She also shows a deep craving for human "pop culture," a permanent fixture of the 2009 Power Girl series being Atlee comically commenting and trying to emulate fictional characters from various movies.

Atlee's powers are currently limitless, while she limits herself to "harmless" feats such as growing large formations of rock with the slowness needed to avoid a geological hazard, and using floating rocks as projectiles and to levitate around, Gerard Shugel, the Ultra-Humanite, while residing in her body, was able to shift nearby tectonic plates with ease or cause volcanoes to erupt at his will. He surmises that Atlee has always had this amazing amount of power, but willingly chose to limit herself in fear of the damage she could cause.

Other versions

Earth-33
On Earth-33, a world of magicians, Terra is an earth mage, who appears to be one with the soil.

Future Terra
The future Terra, of the Teen Titans, is re-imagined as a resistance member, fighting for the freedom of hundreds of alien worlds. She partners with Nightrider until they are folded into a larger resistance cell.

Earth One
In Teen Titans: Earth One, the first Terra re-introduced as a founding member of the Titans. Here she is a troubled, short-tempered girl with issues with her alcoholic mother with the ability to control the earth around her, and in a relationship with Cyborg.

Flashpoint
In the alternate timeline of the Flashpoint event, Terra joined the Amazons' Furies, and it was through her that New Themyscira was saved from destruction when Aquaman flooded Western Europe. Later, Terra was targeted by Siren and Ocean Master, but their plans were foiled when Hippolyta's sister Penthesileia showed up. Terra joined them because her half-brother Geo-Force was used by Aquaman to sink Western Europe.

Dark Multiverse
In Dark Multiverse: The Judas Contract, Dick Grayson unwittingly makes things worse when he talks with Terra about his plans to retire as Robin, explaining that he feels it is important to move on from being a student to find your own way in the world. Terra's twisted psyche causes her to take that idea to its worst extreme as she turns on Slade and orders Wintergreen to subject her to the same drugs that transformed Slade into his current state, with her previously enhanced physiology allowing her to come through the process far more easily than Slade did.

With her enhanced powers, Terra renames herself Gaia and destroys Titans Tower by throwing it into the space along with Starfire, Raven, Cyborg, and Wonder Girl, and subsequently attacks Dick in his room. Dick is briefly rescued by Wally, and the two call Superman for help, but Gaia's heightened powers allow her to even defeat Superman by drawing all of Earth's kryptonite to her, subsequently triggering massive earthquakes just to make it clear to the few survivors of this attack that she is now in control of Earth.

In other media

Television

Teen Titans

Terra appears in Teen Titans, voiced by Ashley Johnson. This version is a more sympathetic and tragic heroine rather than an irredeemable psychopathic villainess. She has little control over her powers, which is a source of shame for her, and ultimately leads her to betray the Titans. She met the Titans after being chased by a giant scorpion, which they helped her defeat. Beast Boy also develops a crush on her, which she is initially unaware of. However, she confides to him her problems controlling her powers, which he agrees to keep secret. Later, during an encounter with Slade, he tells Terra that he knows everything about her, including her lack of control over her powers and all of the disasters that she has caused as a result, and that this is the real reason why she is constantly on the move. Terra agrees to work for him in exchange for training to master her abilities, and eventually returns to Titans Tower as a double agent. At this point, Beast Boy confesses to Terra his infatuation with her, and the two go out. While they are away, Titans Tower is attacked by Slade's robots, which were able to infiltrate the Tower because of Terra disarming their security system. When Terra confesses to Beast Boy what she had done, Beast Boy rejects her. Now given a metallic suit with Slade's insignia on the chest, Terra vows to destroy the Titans. She appears to succeed in doing so and takes over Jump City, but begins to regret her actions. When it becomes apparent that Terra has failed to kill the Titans, Slade takes control of her and forces her to attack Beast Boy, nearly killing him. Terra is able to overcome her control and triggers a volcanic eruption that kills Slade and threatens to destroy the entire city, but sacrifices herself to stop the eruption and is turned to stone in the process. Later, after returning home from defeating the Brotherhood of Evil, Beast Boy is shocked to find a girl that looks like Terra at a local school, apparently unharmed. While she claims to have no recollection of her previous life, it is revealed that the statue Terra turned into had vanished. After failing to convince the girl to return, she ultimately tells Beast Boy to let go of the past.

Teen Titans Go!
Terra appears in Teen Titans Go!, again voiced by Ashley Johnson. This version is a recurring enemy to the Teen Titans, but is friends with Raven and Starfire. Additionally, Beast Boy still has a crush on her, which she is aware of and annoyed by.

Young Justice
Terra appears in Young Justice, voiced by Tara Strong. She was one of many teenagers who were captured by a meta-human trafficking ring and experimented on to have their powers activated. Unlike her other incarnations, she is the Princess of Markovia and has older fraternal twin brothers, Prince Brion/Geo-Force and Crown Prince Gregor who became king after his parents, King Viktor Markov and Queen Ilona DeLamb, were assassinated. During the time she was missing, she became a member of the League of Shadows under Deathstroke and conducted assassination work for them until the titular Outsiders became a potential threat to Deathstroke and his allies. In "True Heroes", Terra allows herself to be "rescued" by the Outsiders to secretly infiltrate them and learn their weaknesses for her master Deathstroke; however, she later truly joins them in the season three finale.

Films
Terra appears in the mid-credits of the animated film Justice League vs. Teen Titans.
Terra appears in Teen Titans: The Judas Contract, voiced by Christina Ricci. In this version, her origins started as a child shortly after her powers emerged. Seeing her as a witch, the entire town turned against her because of her powers, and she would've been killed had it not been for Deathstroke's intervention. She poses as the new Titans member while secretly working as a double-agent for Slade (whom, just like in the DC comics, she also has romantic feelings towards). She acts cold and distant toward the Titans despite their welcoming attitude, but warms up to them over time and even kisses Beast Boy. The day after her one-year anniversary party with the Titans, she and Slade capture all of them (minus Nightwing) and bring them to Brother Blood. However, due to Nightwing's absence, Slade hands Terra over to fill in his spot for the machine that Brother Blood uses to absorb the Titans' powers. When she is saved by Nightwing and awakens, she is enraged that Slade had played her all along and (apparently) kills him. Too ashamed to face her former friends/allies after betraying them, she chooses to bring down the whole fortress on herself. Beast Boy digs her up, and she dies in his arms.
Both the Teen Titans and Teen Titans Go! versions of Terra have non-speaking cameos in Teen Titans Go! Vs. Teen Titans.

Video games
Terra is an unlockable playable character in Teen Titans, voiced again by Ashley Johnson. She is unlocked for the "Master of Games" multiplayer mode after the player completes the "Dock Duel" level.
Terra is a playable character via downloadable content in LEGO Batman 3: Beyond Gotham in the Heroines and Villainesses Pack, alongside Batwoman, Killer Frost, Mera, Power Girl, Plastique, The Spoiler, Raven, Starfire, and Vixen. In the game, her own unique Earth-based abilities enable her to fly over a rock board (a trait which was used in the comics), shoot rock beams, break through cracked LEGO walls, dig and sink into swamp pools.
The Teen Titans Go! incarnation of Terra is also present in Lego Dimensions, with Ashley Johnson reprising her role once again. The player assists her in a sidequest to retrieve a flash drive in Titans Tower, but battles her after discovering that the flash drive contains secret files of the Titans. After her defeat, she is crushed by falling trash from the ceiling and surrenders.
In Injustice 2, Tara Markov is mentioned in the Multiverse scenario "Tremor" in which Deathstroke uses her to terraform the Earth causing sudden Earthquakes on every continent which is represented in battle by the "Terraforming" active modifier which causes earthquakes that briefly stun the combatants on the ground during a match.
In the DC Universe Online episode "Teen Titans: The Judas Contract", Terra is the final boss of the "Titans: H.I.V.E. Reborn" raid. Upon defeat, she loses control of her powers and is buried beneath a volcanic eruption.
Terra appears as a playable character in Lego DC Super-Villains. While she does not have any speaking lines, her vocal effects were provided by Laura Bailey.

Miscellaneous
Terra makes a few appearances in Teen Titans Go!, a comic book series set in the same universe as the Teen Titans animated series. She appeared in issue #11 ("Countdown"), #12 ("Magic & Misdirection") and #51 ("Metamorphosis"). Issue #51 is set after the series finale of the animated series. Terra's brother, Geo-Force, arrives at Titans Tower and relates Terra's origin: she was the princess of Markovia and, along with her brother, was experimented on by sinister interests within the royal court, which gave them both earth-based superpowers. Feeling exploited, Terra ran away, leading to the events of the animated series. At the end of the story, Geo-Force and Beast Boy consider visiting Terra at her school, but decide to leave her be, as she is the happiest she has ever been.

References

External links
 
 
 
 Unofficial Terra I biography
 Unofficial Terra II biography
 Unofficial Terra III biography
 Terra (Teen Titans animated series) biography

Articles about multiple fictional characters
Characters created by George Pérez
Characters created by Marv Wolfman
Comics characters introduced in 1982
Comics characters introduced in 1991
Comics characters introduced in 2007
DC Comics aliens
DC Comics female superheroes
DC Comics female supervillains
DC Comics metahumans
DC Comics sidekicks
Fictional female assassins
Fictional assassins in comics
Fictional suicides
Fictional characters with earth or stone abilities
Fictional characters with gravity abilities
Clone characters in comics
Fictional double agents
Fictional immigrants to the United States
Fictional mercenaries in comics
Fictional princesses
Teenage superheroes